Ross Elliot Barkan (born October 22, 1989) is an American journalist, novelist, columnist, and essayist.

Early life and education
Barkan grew up in Bay Ridge, Brooklyn. He attended Stony Brook University and earned a master's degree from New York University.

Career

Journalist
Barkan was a staff reporter at the Queens Tribune. He covered New York City and national politics for the New York Observer from 2013 to 2016. In April 2016, he rose to prominence after resigning from the Observer over the newspaper's close relationship with Donald Trump, the Republican presidential candidate. The Observers executive editor, Ken Kurson, revealed in a magazine interview he advised Trump on a speech the candidate delivered before the American Israel Public Affairs Committee. Announcing his resignation the day after the Observer endorsed Trump in the New York Republican primary, Barkan later told CNN "a line had been crossed and I thought it was time for myself to depart."

As a columnist and freelance reporter, Barkan has contributed to the Village Voice, The Guardian, The Washington Post, The New Yorker, The New York Times, The Nation, Reuters, Esquire, GQ, New York Daily News, Daily Beast, The Baffler, the Los Angeles Review of Books, the Columbia Journalism Review and The New York Times Magazine. He covered the 2013 New York City mayoral race, including Anthony Weiner's campaign, and the 2016 presidential race. He has taught journalism and media studies at NYU and St. Joseph's College in Brooklyn. He was a staff reporter at New York Magazine and remains a contributor there.

Barkan is currently a columnist for The Guardian and was a columnist for Jacobin magazine. He is a contributing writer to The Nation.

Author
Barkan has published fiction in Post Road, Boston College's literary magazine, and literary criticism in the Iowa Review, Harvard Review, The Rumpus, and The Brooklyn Rail.

His debut novel, Demolition Night, was published in 2018.

His second book, The Prince: Andrew Cuomo,  Coronavirus, and the Fall of New York, was published in 2021. It was well-reviewed, with The Nation calling it a "swift and devastating read."

In 2022, his second novel, The Night Burns Bright, was published.

2018 New York State Senate candidacy
In October 2017, he announced he was running for State Senate in New York City, challenging incumbent Marty Golden in 2018. Barkan's campaign was managed by future-Assemblymember Zohran Mamdani and endorsed by the New York Daily News and local politicians such as Alexandria Ocasio-Cortez, but lost the September 2018 Democratic primary to Andrew Gounardes.

Professional accolades
Barkan has twice been the recipient of the New York Press Club's award for distinguished newspaper commentary, in 2017 and 2019.

References

1989 births
21st-century American journalists
21st-century American male writers
21st-century American novelists
American columnists
American male journalists
Candidates in the 2018 United States elections
Jewish American journalists
Living people
New York (state) Democrats
New York University alumni
People from Bay Ridge, Brooklyn
Place of birth missing (living people)
Stony Brook University alumni
The New York Observer people
Writers from Brooklyn
21st-century American Jews